Lelley is a small village in the East Riding of Yorkshire, England, in an area known as Holderness.

The village forms part of the civil parish of Elstronwick.

Lelley comes from the word 'Lelle' which means 'clearing in the woods'.

The village contains a public house, two benches (one a war memorial and the other a millennium bench) and a telephone box.

Lelley Wesleyan Methodist Church was built in the village in 1859.

In 1823 Lelly was in the parish of Preston and the Wapentake and Liberty of Holderness. Population was 119, which included a carrier who operated between the village and Hull once a week.

The Lelley Windmill, a six-storey corn mill completed in 1790, is a Grade II* Listed Building.

References

External links

Villages in the East Riding of Yorkshire
Holderness